Arthur T. Benjamin (born March 19, 1961) is an American mathematician who specializes in combinatorics. Since 1989 he has been a professor of mathematics at Harvey Mudd College, where he is the Smallwood Family Professor of Mathematics.

He is known for mental math capabilities and "Mathemagics" performances in front of live audiences. His mathematical abilities have been highlighted in newspaper and magazine articles, at TED Talks and on the Colbert Report.

Education
Benjamin earned a Bachelor of Science with highest honors in applied mathematics at Carnegie Mellon University in 1983. He then went on to receive a Master of Science in Engineering in 1985 and a Doctor of Philosophy in 1989 in mathematical sciences at Johns Hopkins University. His PhD dissertation was titled "Turnpike Structures for Optimal Maneuvers", and was supervised by Alan J. Goldman.

During his freshman year at CMU he wrote the lyrics and created the magic effects for the musical comedy, Kije!, in collaboration with author Scott McGregor and composer Arthur Darrell Turner. This musical was the winner of an annual competition and was first performed as the CMU's Spring Musical in 1980.

Career

Academic

Benjamin held several mathematics positions while attending university, including stints with the National Bureau of Standards, the National Security Agency, and the Institute for Defense Analyses. Upon receipt of his PhD he was hired as an assistant professor of mathematics at Harvey Mudd College. He is currently a full professor at Harvey Mudd and was chair of the mathematics department from 2002 to 2004. He has published over 90 academic papers and five books. He has also filmed several sets of lectures on mathematical topics for The Great Courses series from The Teaching Company, including a course on Discrete Mathematics, Mental Math, and The Mathematics of Games and Puzzles: From Cards to Sudoku. He served as co-editor of Math Horizons magazine for five years.

Mathemagics

Benjamin has long had an interest in magic. While in college he honed his skills as a magician and attended magic conferences. At one of these conferences he met well-known magician and skeptic James Randi, who greatly influenced Benjamin's decision to perform Mathemagics shows for live audiences. Randi invited him to perform his mathematical tricks on a television program called Exploring Psychic Powers Live, co-hosted by Uri Geller. Randi also encouraged Benjamin to become involved in the growing skeptical movement. He attended early meetings of the Southern California Skeptics in the 1990s, which later evolved into the Skeptics Society. It was at these meetings that he met Skeptics Society President Michael Shermer, who would later become a co-author on three of Benjamin's books.

Benjamin regularly performs his Mathemagics program for live audiences at schools, colleges, conferences, and even at The Magic Castle in Hollywood, California. These shows feature Benjamin performing mathematical feats like rapidly squaring numbers with up to five digits and correctly identifying the day of the week on which audience members were born based on their birth dates.

He was also featured in Mathemagics, a multimedia disc released for the 3DO Interactive Multiplayer in 1994, which consists largely of short demonstrations and lessons by Benjamin in mental math and Mathemagics.

Awards and honors
American Backgammon Tour Player of the Year, 1997
Fellow of the Institute of Combinatorics and its Applications, 2000
Haimo Distinguished Teaching Award, Mathematical Association of America, 2000
CHOICE Award, Outstanding Academic Title, for Proofs that Really Count: The Art of Combinatorial Proof, American Library Association, 2004
Designated "America's Best Math Whiz" by Reader's Digest, May 2005
Beckenbach Book Prize, for Proofs that Really Count, Mathematical Association of America, 2006
George Pólya Lecturer, Mathematical Association of America, 2006-2008
Selected by The Princeton Review as one of The Best 300 Professors, 2012

Media
Benjamin has appeared in three TED Talks. The first, in 2005, was a demonstration of his Mathemagics show. The second, in 2009, was a plea for improved math education in schools. The third, in 2013, was about the way the Fibonacci series of numbers provides an excellent example of the three most important reasons for studying mathematics: Calculation, Application, and Inspiration.

Benjamin hosted lectures in The Great Courses titled The Joy of Mathematics and Secrets of Mental Math.

He has appeared on numerous television programs throughout the years, including a notable performance on the Colbert Report in 2010. He has been profiled in over 100 articles in periodicals such as The New York Times, People Magazine, USA Today, and Scientific American.

Bibliography

See also 
 Mental calculators
 Mental calculations
 Mental Calculation World Cup

References

External links
 Arthur Benjamin's Home Page
 
 Arthur Benjamin on the Colbert Report

1961 births
Living people
20th-century American mathematicians
21st-century American mathematicians
Carnegie Mellon University alumni
Harvey Mudd College faculty
Johns Hopkins University alumni
People from Cleveland
Mathematics popularizers
Fellows of the American Mathematical Society
American skeptics